Colonel Bob Wilderness is a  protected area located in the southwest corner of Olympic National Forest in the state of Washington. It is named after 19th-century orator Robert Green Ingersoll. Lake Quinault lies about 15 miles to the west. Elevations in the wilderness vary from 300 to 4,509 feet above sea level. The highest elevation is an unnamed peak; the second-highest elevation is Colonel Bob Mountain at 4,492 feet.

History
In 1984, the U.S. Congress established five wilderness areas within the Olympic National Forest:
 Buckhorn Wilderness
 Colonel Bob Wilderness
 Mount Skokomish Wilderness
 The Brothers Wilderness
 Wonder Mountain Wilderness

The Colonel Bob Wilderness sits on the southern flank of the Olympic Wilderness, which was created in 1988.

Recreation
Access by road is via South Shore Quinault Lake Road to the north, or FS Road 2204 to the south. Access by trail is by Colonel Bob Trail #851, Pete's Creek Trail #858, and Fletcher Canyon Trail #857.

References

External links 
 Colonel Bob Wilderness U.S. Forest Service
 Colonel Bob Wilderness Wilderness.net (The University of Montana)

Protected areas of Grays Harbor County, Washington
Protected areas of Jefferson County, Washington
Wilderness areas of Washington (state)
Olympic Mountains
Olympic National Forest
1984 establishments in Washington (state)
Protected areas established in 1984